Douglas Percival Pielou (17 October 1887 – 9 January 1927) was a British soldier who was disabled from injuries received in the First World War and went on to become a Conservative Member of Parliament (MP).

Pielou was born in Glasgow in 1887, the son an excise officer. During the war, he was Regimental Sergeant-Major (RSM) of the Queen's Own Cameron Highlanders, and was severely wounded at the Battle of Loos in 1915.

He was elected at the 1922 general election as MP for the Stourbridge division of Worcestershire, defeating the sitting Liberal MP John William Wilson. Pielou was re-elected in 1923 and 1924, and died in office in 1927, aged 39.

References

External links 

1887 births
1927 deaths
Conservative Party (UK) MPs for English constituencies
UK MPs 1922–1923
UK MPs 1923–1924
UK MPs 1924–1929
British Army personnel of World War I
Queen's Own Cameron Highlanders soldiers
Politicians from Glasgow
British politicians with disabilities